Ornithine is a non-proteinogenic amino acid that plays a role in the urea cycle. Ornithine is abnormally accumulated in the body in ornithine transcarbamylase deficiency. The radical is ornithyl.

Role in urea cycle
L-Ornithine is one of the products of the action of the enzyme arginase on L-arginine, creating urea. Therefore, ornithine is a central part of the urea cycle, which allows for the disposal of excess nitrogen. Ornithine is recycled and, in a manner, is a catalyst. First, ammonia is converted into carbamoyl phosphate. Ornithine is converted into a urea derivative at the δ (terminal) nitrogen by carbamoyl phosphate synthetase. Another nitrogen is added from aspartate, producing the denitrogenated fumarate, and the resulting arginine (a guanidinium compound) is hydrolysed back to ornithine, producing urea. The nitrogens of urea come from the ammonia and aspartate, and the nitrogen in ornithine remains intact.

Ornithine is not an amino acid coded for by DNA, that is, not proteinogenic. However, in mammalian non-hepatic tissues, the main use of the urea cycle is in arginine biosynthesis, so, as an intermediate in metabolic processes, ornithine is quite important.

Other reactions
Ornithine, via the action of ornithine decarboxylase (E.C. 4.1.1.17), is the starting point for the synthesis of polyamines such as putrescine.

In bacteria, such as E. coli, ornithine can be synthesized from L-glutamate.

Research

Exercise fatigue
L-Ornithine supplementation attenuated fatigue in subjects in a placebo-controlled study using a cycle ergometer. The results suggested that L-ornithine has an antifatigue effect in increasing the efficiency of energy consumption and promoting the excretion of ammonia.

Weightlifting supplement
Amino acid supplements, including L-ornithine, are frequently marketed to bodybuilders and weightlifters with claims for increasing levels of human growth hormone (HGH), muscle mass, and strength. A 1993 short 4-day clinical study reported that L-ornithine in combination with L-arginine and L-lysine at 2 g/d each did not increase HGH. A review from 2002 on the topic concluded "The use of specific amino acids to stimulate GH release by athletes is not recommended."

Cirrhosis
L-Ornithine L-aspartate (LOLA), a stable salt of ornithine and aspartic acid, has been used in the treatment of cirrhosis.

References

External links 

 Ornithine mass Spectrum

Basic amino acids
Urea cycle
Diamines
Non-proteinogenic amino acids